"Holiday" is a song by American indie rock band Vampire Weekend. It was released as the third single from their album Contra. The video premiered on MTV.com on May 27, 2010. The song was featured in Christmas-themed television advertisements for Tommy Hilfiger and Honda during the 2010 holiday season. The single's B-side, "Ottoman", originally appeared on the soundtrack for the 2008 romantic comedy film Nick and Norah's Infinite Playlist.

Music video
The music video was directed by directing duo The Malloys, who also directed the video for the previous single from Contra, "Giving Up the Gun". It features the band dressed up as 18th century aristocrats in what appears to be the present day, taking a vacation from their jobs and doing very un-monarchical activities including attending at a pool party, driving around California in a '63 Impala and ordering In-N-Out drive-thru, going to the beach, vandalism, and assault, among other crazy activities.

The concept behind the video was to portray the band as being "fish out of water" in Los Angeles. They used their manager's pool in Hollywood Hills to shoot the pool party scenes. The band did not have a permit to shoot the music video, so all of the driving scenes were shot under technically illegal circumstances, while, ironically, the scenes in which they are assaulting a beach goer and spray painting graffiti were staged and perfectly legal. During shooting, one band member ripped the pants of his rented costume. While filming the dessert scene, the band became ill due to the amount of sugar that the members consumed during the shooting and re-shooting of the scene.

The video was featured on the VH1 show Pop-Up Video.

Track listing
"Holiday" - 2:18
"Ottoman" - 4:02

Personnel
Vampire Weekend
 Ezra Koenig – lead vocals, guitar
 Rostam Batmanglij – piano, background vocals, vocal harmonies, keyboards, harpsichord, VSS-30, drum, synth, sampler programming, guitar
 Christopher Tomson – drums
 Chris Baio – bass

Technical
 Rostam Batmanglij – mixing, engineering
 Justin Gerrish – mixing, engineering
 Shane Stoneback – engineering
 Fernando Lodeiro – engineering assistance
 Emily Lazar – mastering
 Joe LaPorta – assistant mastering engineering

Chart performance

References

2009 songs
2010 singles
Vampire Weekend songs
XL Recordings singles
Music videos directed by The Malloys
Songs written by Rostam Batmanglij
Songs written by Chris Baio
Songs written by Ezra Koenig
Songs written by Chris Tomson